Magnetic current is, nominally, a current composed of fictitious moving magnetic monopoles. It has the unit volt. Magnetic currents produce an electric field analogously to the production of a magnetic field by electric currents. The superscripts indicate total and impressed magnetic current density. The impressed currents are the energy sources. In many useful cases, a distribution of electric charge can be mathematically replaced by an equivalent distribution of magnetic current. This artifice can be used to simplify some electromagnetic field problems. It is possible to use both electric current densities and magnetic current densities in the same analysis.

The direction of the electric field produced by magnetic currents is determined by the left-hand rule (opposite direction as determined by the right-hand rule) as evidenced by the negative sign in the equation

Magnetic displacement current 

where
 is the total magnetic current.
 is the impressed magnetic current (energy source).

Electric vector potential 

The electric vector potential, F, is computed from the magnetic current density, in the same way that the magnetic vector potential, A, is computed from the electric current density.   Examples of use include finite diameter wire antennas and transformers.

magnetic vector potential:

electric vector potential:

where F at point  and time  is calculated from magnetic currents at distant position  at an earlier time . The location  is a source point within volume Ω that contains the magnetic current distribution.  The integration variable, is a volume element around position .  The earlier time  is called the retarded time, and calculated as

Retarded time accounts for the accounts for the time required for electromagnetic effects to propagate from point  to point .

Phasor form 

When all the functions of time are sinusoids of the same frequency, the time domain equation can be replaced with a frequency domain equation.  Retarded time is replaced with a phase term.

Magnetic frill generator 

A distribution of magnetic current, commonly called a magnetic frill generator, may be used to replace the driving source and feed line in the analysis of a finite diameter dipole antenna. The voltage source and feed line impedance are subsumed into the magnetic current density.

The inner radius of the frill is the same as the radius of the dipole.  The outer radius is chosen so that

where
  = impedance of the feed transmission line (not shown).
  = impedance of free space.

The equation is the same as the equation for the impedance of a coaxial cable.  However, a coaxial cable feed line is not assumed and not required.

The amplitude of the magnetic current density phasor is given by:
 with 
where 
  = radial distance from the axis.
 .
  = magnitude of the source voltage phasor driving the feed line.

Notes

References 

Electromagnetism
Antennas